Diether H. Haenicke (May 19, 1935 – February 15, 2009) was president of Western Michigan University in Kalamazoo, Michigan from 1985 to 1998, and again (as interim president) from 2006 to 2007. A large building on campus, Haenicke Hall, is named for him.

In 1962, Haenicke received his doctorate, magna cum laude, from the University of Munich.

In 1998, Haenicke stepped down from the presidency, but continued to teach foreign languages until 2004.

On August 15, 2006, the Western Michigan University Board of Trustees voted to fire then-president Judith Bailey, and unanimously voted to appoint Haenicke as interim president. He served as interim president from September 2006 until July 2007, when John Dunn assumed the university presidency.

In December 2008, while giving a speech, Haenicke went into cardiac arrest and sustained a head injury. He died on February 15, 2009, in Kalamazoo, from ensuing complications.

Appearance on Home Improvement 
In 1995, Haenicke made a cameo appearance in one episode of the sitcom Home Improvement, starring Tim Allen who is a 1976 graduate of WMU. In that episode, Haenicke played himself, and presented Allen's character, Tim "The Tool Man" Taylor, with an honorary doctorate.

The Home Improvement episode would prove to be prophetic, for Allen would actually later be awarded an honorary doctor of fine arts degree by WMU in 1998. However, Haenicke did not present Allen's degree this time, because he would also receive his own honorary degree during the same ceremony.

References

External links 
Western Michigan University - Office of the President
President Haenicke returns to lead WMU

1935 births
2009 deaths
Accidental deaths in Michigan
German emigrants to the United States
German academics
Presidents of Western Michigan University
Ludwig Maximilian University of Munich alumni
Accidental deaths from falls
Deaths from head injury
20th-century American academics